The 1958 Bowling Green Falcons football team was an American football team that represented Bowling Green State University in the Mid-American Conference (MAC) during the 1958 NCAA University Division football season. In their fourth season under head coach Doyt Perry, the Falcons compiled a 7–2 record (4–2 against MAC opponents), finished in third place in the MAC, and outscored all opponents by a combined total of 218 to 91.

On November 8, the Falcons defeated Ohio, 33–6, starting an 18-game winning streak that continued until November 12, 1960. The streak remains the longest in Bowling Green history.

The team's statistical leaders were Bob Colburn with 685 passing yards, Bob Ramlow with 779 rushing yards, and Bernie Casey with 310 receiving yards. Ray Reese was the team captain. Harold Furcron received the team's Most Valuable Player award. Furcron set a Bowling Green record, since broken, with an 81-yard run against Dayton. Jerry Dianiska also had an 80-yard run against Ohio.

Schedule

References

Bowling Green
Bowling Green Falcons football seasons
Bowling Green Falcons football